Minuscule 115 (in the Gregory-Aland numbering), ε 1096 (Soden), is a Greek minuscule manuscript of the New Testament, on parchment leaves. Palaeographically it has been assigned to the 11th century. It has marginalia.

Description 

The codex contains the text of the four Gospels on 271 parchment leaves (size ) with some lacunae (Matt. 1:1-8:9; Mark 5:23-36; Luke 1:78-2:9; 6:4-15; John 11:2-end). The text is written in one column per page, in 19 lines per page.

Text 
Hermann von Soden included the manuscript to the group Ifb, together with manuscripts 7, 179, 267, 659, 827, and parts of 185, 1082, 1391, 1402, 1606. It is classified to the Family 1424.

Kurt Aland the Greek text of the codex did not place in any Category.

According to the Claremont Profile Method it represents textual family Kx in Luke 10. In Luke 1 and Luke 20 it has mixture of Byzantine families.

History 

In 1724 it belonged to Bernard Mould in Smyrna (as minuscule 116). It was examined by Griesbach, Bloomfield, and Scholz.
C. R. Gregory saw it in 1883.

It is currently housed at the British Library (Harley MS 5559).

See also 

 List of New Testament minuscules
 Biblical manuscript
 Textual criticism

References

Further reading 

 Griesbach, Symbolae criticae ad supplendas et corrigendas variarum N. T. lectionum collectiones (Halle, 1793), p. CLXXXXV

External links 
 Minuscule 115 at the Encyclopedia of Textual Criticism
 Minuscule 115 at the British Library.

Greek New Testament minuscules
11th-century biblical manuscripts
Harleian Collection